Ronto can refer to:

 ronto-, a metric prefix denoting a factor of 10−27

 Rontó, the Hungarian name for Rontău village, Sânmartin Commune, Bihor County, Romania